"I See Red" is a song written by Gerry Rafferty's brother, Jim Rafferty. I See Red was first recorded by Anni-Frid Lyngstad of ABBA, under the name "Frida" for her first English-language studio album, Something's Going On. Lyngstad's version wasn't released as a single aside from South Africa where it didn't chart, although subsequent cover versions by other artists such as the Irish folk group, Clannad, included in their album, Magical Ring, resulted in a moderate success. Clannad's version was the follow-up single to their breakthrough hit "Theme from Harry's Game". Gerry Rafferty himself also recorded a version on his 1992 album, On a Wing and a Prayer.

Anni-Frid Lyngstad's version

This song was released as a single in South Africa in December 1982, where 4 months earlier, Frida's hit single "I Know There's Something Going On" was released in the same territory. The single was coupled with "I Got Something", written by Tomas Ledin. In the sales-based charts, Lyngstad's version did not fare well. However, on the 702 Radio Top 20 charts, "I See Red" rose up to #15 in South Africa.

Music video
Alongside with "I Know There's Something Going On", "To Turn The Stone" and "Here We'll Stay", "I See Red" had a music video directed to promote her album Something's Going On. The promotional video features Lyngstad lip-syncing to a montage between pinball machines, a group of acrobats dancing, and balls in a contemporary-styled stage. Stuart Orme directed the music video for Lyngstad's version.

Track listing
7" Vinyl
 "I See Red" – 4:32
 "I Got Something" – 4:05

Clannad version 

In 1983, Clannad released the song as a single in February 1983 which later appeared on their album Magical Ring. Clannad's version charted at No. 81 in the UK Charts.

Other cover versions
In 1983 the song was covered by Estonian singer Velly Joonas under the title "Stopp, seisku aeg" ("Stop The Time"). It was not until it was released in 2015 as a single, gaining a surprise global cult popularity. 

In 1992, Gerry Rafferty covered "I See Red" for his album, On A Wing And A Prayer.

References 

Anni-Frid Lyngstad songs
Clannad songs
1983 singles
1982 songs
Polar Music singles
RCA Records singles
Song recordings produced by Phil Collins